Christian Guttmann is an entrepreneur in Artificial Intelligence, Machine Learning and Data Science. He has three citizenships. He is currently the vice president, global head of Artificial Intelligence and Chief Artificial Intelligence and Data officer at Tietoevry. At Tietoevry, he is responsible for strategy and execution of Artificial Intelligence Innovation and Business. He is an adjunct associate professor at the University of New South Wales, Australia and Adjunct researcher at the Karolinska Institute, Sweden. Guttmann has edited and authored 7 books, over 50 publications and 4 patents in the field of Artificial Intelligence. He is a keynote speaker at international events, including the International Council for Information Technology (ICA) in Government Administration and CeBIT and is cited by MIT Sloan Management review and Bloomberg.

Biography 
Christian Guttmann grew up in Germany and Australia, and spent much of his life in Sweden, where he studied Artificial Intelligence and Psychology in the late 90s. He moved back to Australia around the millennium, completed his PhD in Distributed Artificial Intelligence and after an extended period in Melbourne and Sydney in Australia, he moved again to Sweden in 2014.

Guttmann has dedicated his career and life's work to the advancement of Artificial Intelligence and Machine Learning. In 2019, he was named Top 100 AI global leader in Artificial Intelligence among global AI leaders, such as Andrew Ng. He has worked scientifically, entrepreneurially, and industrially in AI for over 25 years, starting with completed PhD and master's degrees in Psychology and Artificial Intelligence at leading Swedish, Australian and German universities (Monash University, Stockholm University, Royal Institute of Technology, Melbourne University and Paderborn University). His PhD research focused on Artificial Intelligence and Multi-Agent Systems, e.g. how artificial agents make optimal decisions together, and was nominated for the Australasian Dissertation Award.

In Artificial Intelligence, he is a social influencer on Artificial Intelligence in Social Media with over 50000 followers combined on Linkedin and Twitter. Among his peers in the area of Artificial Intelligence and Machine Learning, he has the highest number of followers across the Northern European countries.

Non-Profit Activities 
The Nordic Artificial Intelligence Institute (NAII) is an international and independent non-profit organisation focusing on the use of Artificial Intelligence for social and economic prosperity. The NAII is an alliance of global AI leaders, including people from countries such as the United States of America, China, Sweden, Germany, and Australia. Guttmann co-founded this institute as there is a need in understanding Artificial Intelligence in a business and societal context—and there are few independent organisations that can provide guidance to governments and industry organisations. The NAII support government and industry leaders in making strategic decisions on AI for societal and economic frameworks.

Guttmann actively supports awareness campaigns on cancer. One reason is that his father died of cancer.

Research and Innovation Contribution 

Guttmann is an adjunct associated professor at the University of New South Wales in Australia as an adjunct faculty member. Guttmann is currently an adjunct senior researcher at the Karolinska Institute in Sweden, he supervises PhD students and research projects in Artificial Intelligence, medical care, diagnosis and treatments, as well as health care management and services.

He has been a visiting scholar and invited speaker regarding Artificial Intelligence at over 70 international institutes, universities, and companies, including Harvard University (USA), Stanford University (USA), Sony Research (Japan), University of Rey Juan Carlos (Spain), University of Frankfurt (Germany), University of Canterbury (New Zealand), University of Rio Grande do Sul (Porto Alegre, Brazil), British Telecom Research Laboratories (United Kingdom), University of Utrecht (Netherlands), IBM Research (China and Japan), and Hewlett Packard Laboratories (Palo Alto, USA).

Guttmann has been in over 80 organisational and programme committees for scientific and industrial AI and Machine Learning conferences, including the International Joint Conference on Artificial Intelligence, the International Conference of Autonomous Agents and Multi Agent Systems.

His PhD thesis work focuses on "Distributed Artificial Intelligence" related to Multi-Agent Systems. His research investigates the basic building of Block Chain, years before this technology has become a major technology. This research was nominated for the Autonomous Agent and Multi Agent Systems Award and the Australasian Dissertation Award. His PhD supervisor and intellectual role models have been Prof. Dr. Michael Georgeff, and his PhD "grand supervisor" Prof. Dr. Judea Pearl. Guttmann's Master thesis was on building a strategic decision making architecture for fully autonomous four-legged robot team - this research received a national Artificial Intelligence award by the Swedish Artificial Intelligence Society in 1999.

He collaborates with other leaders in AI, such as Professor Yann LeCun (a primary driver of Convolutional Neural Networks). Yann is the VP of AI at Facebook and Dr. Anand Rao (Global head of AI, PWC).

Industry Leadership Contributions 

In Germany, Sweden, Finland, United Arab Emirates (Dubai), Australia, and the United States of America, Guttmann has been an area and theme leader in Artificial Intelligence and Innovation at some of the world's largest tech companies, including IBM, TietoEvry, HP, Ericsson, and British Telecom. He led multi disciplinary teams in the delivery of large client projects, e.g. for governmental organisations, hospitals and large industry clients.

Guttmann gives industry talks at international industry, political and scientific events, including Cebit (Australia), Rise of AI (Germany), Royal Society of Medicine (London, UK), "AI with the Best" (San Francisco), Upgraded (Helsinki), AIMaster (Berlin), and DigiGov. His IP and patents are in AI, ML and social and mobile technologies.

Entrepreneurship 
Guttmann founded and worked in several startups that use Artificial Intelligence, machine learning and natural language understanding. These startups worked in industries such as health care, finance, retail and music recommendation, including HealthiHabits, AgentArts, IVBAR and OneStone Technology. Most of the startups that Guttmann founded or led the AI technology team, were acquired by e.g. Lotus Notes (IBM) and Fast (Microsoft).

Guttmann is a Non Executive Board member of Intelligent Ultrasound Group Plc - a company in clinical ultrasound technology using Artificial Intelligence. The company provides clinicians with real-time support in classrooms and clinics with high-fidelity simulators to train clinicians, and AI image analysis software to support and guide them in the clinic.

Filmography 
Guttmann was a side actor in movies and developed an interest in directing movies on societal issues and science fiction. An example of his production includes the movie "The Dream Children", 2015, playing the role of the Man in the Park.

References

Australian computer scientists
Living people
Year of birth missing (living people)